This is a list of Canadian short story writers.

A
Gil Adamson
Caroline Adderson
Kelley Aitken
Donald Alarie
André Alexis
Timothy J. Anderson
Gail Anderson-Dargatz
David Arnason
Margaret Atwood
Mona Awad

B
Arjun Basu
Peter Behrens
Moe Berg
Kris Bertin
David Bezmozgis
Shashi Bhat
Sandra Birdsell
Dennis Bock
Maxime Raymond Bock
Kenneth Bonert
George Bowering
Joseph Boyden
Frances Boyle
Lois Braun
Krista Bridge
Ernest Buckler
Kayt Burgess
Bonnie Burnard

C
Morley Callaghan
Roch Carrier
Kate Cayley
Michael Christie
Joan Clark
Austin Clarke
Lynn Coady
Matt Cohen
Christy Ann Conlin
Paige Cooper
Ann Copeland
Archie Crail
Isabella Valancy Crawford
Eva Crocker
Michael Crummey

D
Robertson Davies
Elisabeth de Mariaffi
Anthony de Sa
Don Dickinson
Kildare Dobbs
Norma Dunning

E
Evelyn Eaton
Caterina Edwards
George Elliott
Marina Endicott
Sharon English
Gloria Escomel

F
M. A. C. Farrant
Timothy Findley
Stephen Finucan
Jon Paul Fiorentino
Anne Fleming
Cynthia Flood
Tess Fragoulis
Raymond Fraser

G
Mavis Gallant
Hugh Garner
Zsuzsi Gartner
Elyse Gasco
Bill Gaston
Connie Gault
Margaret Gibson
John Patrick Gillese
Danuta Gleed
John Gould
Katherine Govier
Barbara Gowdy
R. W. Gray
Robert Joseph Greene
Stephen Guppy

H
Jane Eaton Hamilton
Kevin Hardcastle
Sydney Hegele
Lawrence Hill
Greg Hollingshead
Hugh Hood
David Huebert

I
George K. Ilsley

J
Lorna Jackson
Mark Anthony Jarman

K
Greg Kearney
Julie Keith
Susan Kerslake
W. P. Kinsella
Greg Kramer
Aaron Kreuter
Kathryn Kuitenbrouwer

L
Angélique Lalonde
Margaret Laurence
Karen Lawrence
Stephen Leacock
John B. Lee
Catherine Leroux
Alex Leslie
Carrianne Leung
Norman Levine
Billie Livingston
Sidura Ludwig

M
Alexander MacLeod
Alistair MacLeod
Paul Marlowe
Émile Martel
Yann Martel
Derek McCormack
Oonah McFee
Robert McGill
Stuart McLean
Eugene McNamara
Marianne Micros
Lisa Moore
Alice Munro
Sheila Murray
Téa Mutonji

N
Darlene Naponse
André Narbonne
Saleema Nawaz
Jen Neale
Alden Nowlan

O
Heather O'Neill

P
Fawn Parker
Kevin Patterson
Fred Pellerin
H. R. Percy
Susan Perly
Casey Plett

Q
Andy Quan
Marion Quednau

R
Kenneth Radu
Ahmad Danny Ramadan
Zalika Reid-Benta
Maria Reva
Mordecai Richler
Spider Robinson
Patrick Roscoe
Rebecca Rosenblum
Sinclair Ross
Stuart Ross
Andrea Routley
Naben Ruthnum

S
Sandra Sabatini
Sarah Selecky
Carol Shields
Andy Sinclair
Jaspreet Singh
Neil Smith
Caro Soles
Rae Spoon
Eva Stachniak
Joel A. Sutherland
Shawn Syms

T
Madeleine Thien
Matthew J. Trafford
Catharine Parr Traill

U
Jane Urquhart

V
W.D. Valgardson
Guy Vanderhaeghe

W
Tracey Waddleton
Jack Wang
Jessica Westhead
Martin West
Ethel Wilson

Z
Robert Zend
Daniel Zomparelli

 
Short story writers